The Gainestown Methodist Church and Cemetery is a historic United Methodist Church building and its adjacent cemetery in Gainestown, Alabama, United States.  It was added to the National Register of Historic Places on July 28, 1999, due to its architectural significance.

History
Gainestown Methodist Church was founded in 1819 by Reverend Joshua Wilson. A two-story church building was constructed in 1854 with the church auditorium on the lower floor and a Masonic lodge meeting room on the upper.  That building was severely damaged by a tornado in 1911. It was rebuilt in that same year as a one-story building, using as much salvaged material from the original building as was possible.

References

National Register of Historic Places in Clarke County, Alabama
Churches completed in 1911
20th-century Methodist church buildings in the United States
United Methodist churches in Alabama
Churches on the National Register of Historic Places in Alabama
Methodist cemeteries